Maren Grøthe (born 14 July 2001) is a Norwegian politician currently serving as a deputy representative for Sør-Trøndelag since 2021. A member of the Centre Party, she is the youngest person elected as a representative in the Storting.

Political career

Parliament
She was elected deputy representative to the Storting from the constituency of Sør-Trøndelag for the period 2021–2025, for the Centre  Party, and deputises for Ola Borten Moe while he is government minister.

She is the youngest representative ever to meet regularly at the Storting. She hails from Hølonda.

In the Storting, she is a member of the Standing Committee on Education and Research for the period 2021–2025.

References

2001 births
Living people
People from Melhus
Centre  Party (Norway) politicians
Members of the Storting